The 1995 New York Jets season was the 36th season for the team and the 26th in the National Football League. The Jets entered the 1995 season with their third different head coach in as many years as former Philadelphia Eagles head coach Rich Kotite was hired to replace Pete Carroll, who was fired after posting a 6–10 record in his only season as Jets head coach. Kotite did not have any success in his first year, as the team finished 3–13. The 13 losses set a team record, while the three wins were the fewest of any Jets team since 1977, when the team completed their third consecutive 3–11 season. The Jets were the first team to lose to the Carolina Panthers with a 26-15 loss in week 7.

Starting with their October 1 game against the Oakland Raiders, the Jets began wearing a “DS” graphic in the shape of a football as a memorial to general manager Dick Steinberg, who had died on September 25 from stomach cancer.

Offseason

1995 Expansion Draft

NFL Draft

Undrafted Free Agents

Personnel

Staff

Roster

Regular season

Schedule

Standings

Season summary

Week 2 vs Colts

References

External links 
 1995 statistics

New York Jets seasons
New York Jets
New York Jets season
20th century in East Rutherford, New Jersey
Meadowlands Sports Complex